Siobhan Rebecca Chamberlain (born 15 August 1983) is an English sports pundit, commentator, and former  professional footballer who last played as a goalkeeper. 

She joined Manchester United in 2018 after playing for Liverpool. Before joining Liverpool in December 2015, she had been at Notts County on loan from Arsenal. Chamberlain previously played at the top club level for Chelsea, Fulham, Birmingham City and Bristol Academy, as well as for North American W-League club Vancouver Whitecaps. She has represented the England women's national football team on 50 occasions since her debut in 2004. This included being part of the squad at three FIFA Women's World Cups and three UEFA Women's Championships.

Club career

Early career
A childhood gymnast, Chamberlain took up goalkeeping at the age of 14 and was spotted by Chelsea. In 2003, she left Chelsea for Fulham, who had lost their professional status and Norwegian international goalkeeper Astrid Johannessen. Chamberlain played for Fulham in the UEFA Women's Cup, but moved on to Birmingham City at the end of the season. At Birmingham City Chamberlain provided competition for Jo Fletcher during the 2004–05 season. Chamberlain then played for Bristol Academy for two seasons, leaving to rejoin Chelsea in the 2007 close season. On 26 May 2010, she left Chelsea and signed for Canadian W-League Vancouver Whitecaps.

Bristol Academy
In October 2010, Chamberlain returned to Bristol Academy ahead of their inaugural FA WSL campaign. She helped Bristol reach the FA Women's Cup final, played in the UEFA Women's Champions League and was named in the WSL team of the season. In April 2012 she was appointed as one of eight digital media ambassadors, one from each team, who wear their Twitter account name on their shirt sleeves to raise the profile of the WSL.

Arsenal
 
In December 2013, Chamberlain quit Bristol Academy to sign a two-year contract with Arsenal, where she would rival the incumbent goalkeeper Emma Byrne for a starting position. Chamberlain had played every minute of every game in her three seasons back at Bristol, but craved a new challenge: "My ambition is to be England's number one so the added competition at Arsenal is what I need at this point in my career."

Loan to Notts County
On 9 July 2015, Chamberlain moved to Notts County on loan until the end of the season following injury to England teammate Carly Telford. She was ineligible for the 2015 FA Women's Cup Final and The Football Association refused Notts County's request for dispensation to sign another goalkeeper, so Telford played in the team's 1–0 defeat despite a shoulder injury.

Liverpool
Chamberlain failed to dislodge Byrne from Arsenal's starting line-up and was mainly used in cup matches. She was pushed further down the pecking order by the signing of Sari van Veenendaal. In December 2015, Liverpool announced their signing of Chamberlain on a one-year contract. When Liverpool decided not to renew 34-year-old Chamberlain's contract in May 2018, she criticised the club for a lack of ambition.

Manchester United
 
On 13 July 2018, it was announced that Chamberlain would join Manchester United for their inaugural season playing in the FA Women's Championship. During a pre-season friendly against her former club Liverpool on 17 July 2018, Chamberlain suffered a suspected serious neck injury and was rushed to hospital; however, checks revealed that the injury was not as serious as first thought. She recovered in time for the start of the season and made her competitive debut for Manchester United in a 1–0 League Cup victory against Liverpool on 19 August. On 9 September, she made her Championship debut in a 12–0 win against Aston Villa. Chamberlain did not concede a league goal until United's sixth game, with Angela Addison's 82nd minute consolation goal in United's 4–1 win ending a streak of 531 minutes without conceding. United clinched the Championship title on 20 April 2019 with a 7–0 win over Crystal Palace with Chamberlain having played in all 18 league matches, conceding seven goals in that time. She subsequently missed the final two games of the season with a foot injury, collecting her winners medal on the last day of the season in an aircast. In May 2019, she was named PFA Community Champion of the Year for her work with the Manchester United Foundation.

For the 2019–20 season, Chamberlain took part in a reduced training programme while pregnant with her first child. She expressed a desire to return to the club full-time following her pregnancy. While sidelined, Chamberlain explored opportunities with the club's social media and press team, worked as club photographer and commentated on matches for the club's TV channel. She terminated her contract by mutual consent on 15 July 2020.

Retirement 
On 4 September 2020, after fielding several offers and spending the 2020–21 preseason training with an unnamed WSL club, Chamberlain announced her retirement from professional football in order to spend more time with her family and focus on her master's in sporting directorship. She has continued to serve as a commentator alongside Pien Meulensteen on MUTV.

International career

Chamberlain progressed through the youth ranks with England before making her senior debut against the Netherlands in September 2004. She won her second cap in a record 13–0 win against Hungary and her third against Sweden in Cyprus.

Chamberlain was named in England's squad for the 2007 World Cup. In May 2009, Chamberlain was one of the first 17 female players to be given central contracts by The Football Association. She went to UEFA Women's Euro 2009 as an understudy to first-choice Rachel Brown.

When Brown was controversially sent-off in a World Cup qualifying play-off in Switzerland, Chamberlain came on as her replacement. By the 2011 World Cup American-born Karen Bardsley had taken over the England team's first-choice goalkeeping position, with Brown and Chamberlain as back-ups. Bardsley also retained the number one role at UEFA Women's Euro 2013.

In May 2015, national coach Mark Sampson named Chamberlain in his final squad for the 2015 FIFA Women's World Cup, to be hosted in Canada. On 27 June 2015, she replaced fellow goalkeeper Bardsley in the 52nd minute of England's 2–1 quarter-final win over hosts Canada, as her country reached the semi-finals of the World Cup for the first time in their history. Bardsley had suffered a swollen eye after an allergic reaction to the rubber crumb on the controversial artificial turf pitch, but was restored to the team for England's semi-final defeat by Japan.

At UEFA Women's Euro 2017, Chamberlain was again named as Bardsley's understudy. She played 90 minutes in a dead rubber group win over Portugal and again entered play as a quarter-final substitute following another injury to Bardsley. She was selected for the semi-final against hosts the Netherlands but conceded three unanswered goals as England exited the competition. At the 2018 SheBelieves Cup Chamberlain won her 50th England cap.

Personal life
Chamberlain joined the National Player Development Centre at Loughborough University when she was 18, training every day while earning a degree in sports science and a master's degree in sports nutrition. She was later employed as a lecturer / coach by South Gloucestershire and Stroud College in Bristol.

In 2015, Chamberlain married Leigh Moore, a former media assistant at the FA. Moore was left in charge of planning the wedding while Chamberlain was away at the 2015 FIFA Women's World Cup. In July 2019, the couple announced they were expecting their first child. Emilia Francesca Moore was born on 31 January 2020.

In July 2018, Chamberlain became a member of pledge-based charity Common Goal. In July 2020, Chamberlain became a club ambassador for Hashtag United F.C. following the club's creation of a fourth division women's team ahead of the 2020–21 season.

Career statistics

Club

Honours
Arsenal
FA Women's Cup: 2013–14

Manchester United
FA Women's Championship: 2018–19

England
Cyprus Cup: 2009, 2013, 2015
UEFA Women's Championship runner-up: 2009
FIFA Women's World Cup third place: 2015

Individual
PFA FA WSL 1 Team of the Year: 2011, 2013–14

References

External links

Profile at ManUtd.com

1983 births
Living people
English women's footballers
England women's international footballers
Bristol Academy W.F.C. players
Chelsea F.C. Women players
Arsenal W.F.C. players
Fulham L.F.C. players
Notts County L.F.C. players
Liverpool F.C. Women players
Birmingham City W.F.C. players
Manchester United W.F.C. players
FA Women's National League players
Women's Super League players
2007 FIFA Women's World Cup players
2011 FIFA Women's World Cup players
2015 FIFA Women's World Cup players
Vancouver Whitecaps FC (women) players
England women's under-23 international footballers
Footballers from Greater London
Women's association football goalkeepers
English expatriate women's footballers
English expatriate sportspeople in Canada
Expatriate women's soccer players in Canada
UEFA Women's Euro 2017 players